Henry William "Harry" Bearryman (26 September 1924 – December 1976), was an English footballer who played as a wing half in the Football League.

Career
Born in Wandsworth, London, Bearryman began his career at Chelsea where he made  35 appearances during his time there. He joined Colchester United in 1947 and made 173 appearances in the Football League and 120 appearances in the Southern Football League. Bearryman left the U's in 1954 and joined the Metropolitan Police football team. He died in December 1976.

Honours

Club
Colchester United
 Southern Football League Runner-up (1): 1949–50
 Southern Football League Cup Winner (1): 1949–50
 Southern Football League Cup Runner-up (1): 1948–49

References

External links
 
 Harry Bearryman at Colchester United Archive Database

1924 births
1976 deaths
English footballers
Footballers from Wandsworth
Chelsea F.C. players
Colchester United F.C. players
Metropolitan Police F.C. players
English Football League players
Association football midfielders